Spiller is an unincorporated community in Meigs County, in the U.S. state of Ohio.

History
A post office called "Spiller", was established in 1893, and remained in operation until 1918. Spiller had its own schoolhouse until 1951.

References

Unincorporated communities in Meigs County, Ohio
Unincorporated communities in Ohio